Väckelsång is a locality situated in Tingsryd Municipality, Kronoberg County, Sweden with 905 inhabitants in 2010.

References 

Populated places in Kronoberg County
Populated places in Tingsryd Municipality
Värend